The 2019–20 Bundesliga was the 78th season of the Bundesliga, Germany's premier field hockey league. It began on 7 September 2019 and it concluded with the championship final on 24 May 2019 in Mannheim. Due to the COVID-19 pandemic the league was suspended on 13 March until 1 April 2020. The season returned on 2 September 2020 and was extended into 2021 with an extra round of matches.

For the 2019–20 season, the German Hockey Federation introduced a new format. The league was played by twelve teams grouped in two pools of six (Pool A and Pool B) based on the previous season's ranking. The teams of the same pool competed 2 times and faced the teams of the other pool once. The first four of each pool were qualified for the play-offs and the last two of each pool played the play-downs.

Uhlenhorst Mülheim are the two-time defending champions.

Teams

A total of 12 teams participated in the 2019–2021 edition of the Bundesliga. The promoted teams were Großflottbek and TSV Mannheim who replaced Düsseldorfer HC and Blau-Weiss Berlin.

Number of teams by state

Regular season

Pool A

Pool B

Overall table
The leading team in this table qualifies for the Euro Hockey League.

Results

Matches 1–22

Matches 23–27

Pool A

Pool B

Top goalscorers

Play-downs

Overview
The play-downs were played in a best of three format with the first match hosted by the weaker-placed team on 25 April and the return match and potential third decisive match hosted by the better placed team on 1 and 2 May respectively.

|}

Matches

TSV Mannheim won series 2–0 and stay in the Bundesliga while Großflottbeker THGC are relegated to the 2. Bundesliga.

Nürnberger HTC won series 2–1 and stay in the Bundesliga while Crefelder HTC are relegated to the 2. Bundesliga.

Play-offs
The quarter-finals were played in a best of three format with the first match hosted by the weaker-placed team on 25 April and the return match and potential third decisive match hosted by the better placed team on 1 and 2 May respectively. The semi-finals and final were hosted by Mannheimer HC in Mannheim, Baden-Württemberg.

Bracket

Quarter-finals

Rot-Weiss Köln won series 2–0.

Uhlenhorst Mülheim won series 2–0.

Mannheimer HC won series 2–0.

Berliner HC won series 2–0.

Semi-finals

Final

References

Feldhockey Bundesliga (Men's field hockey)
Bundesliga
Bundesliga
Feldhockey-Bundesliga 2019-20
Feldhockey-Bundesliga 2019-20
Feldhockey-Bundesliga 2019-20
Feldhockey-Bundesliga